The Sky Flirt is a Czech single-place paraglider, designed and produced by Sky Paragliders of Frýdlant nad Ostravicí. It is now out of production.

Design and development
The Flirt was designed as an advanced performance glider. The models are each named for their approximate wing area in square metres.

Variants
Flirt 24
Small-sized model for lighter pilots. The glider model is AFNOR Performance certified.
Flirt 26
Mid-sized model for medium-weight pilots. The glider model is AFNOR Performance certified.
Flirt 28
Large-sized model for heavier pilots. The glider model is AFNOR Performance certified.

Specifications (Flirt 26)

References

Flirt
Paragliders